Benson Historic District is a national historic district located at Benson, Johnston County, North Carolina.  It encompasses 104 contributing buildings in the town of Benson.  It includes notable examples of Late Victorian and Bungalow / American Craftsman style architecture and buildings dating from about 1900 to 1930. It includes commercial, residential, ecclesiastical, and educational structures. Notable buildings include the Farmers Commercial Bank (1921), C. T. Johnson Building (1910), James E. Wilson Livery Stable· and Store (c. 1925), Carolina-Parrish Hotel (c. 1918), Boon-Lawhorn House, Lonnie Stevens House (c. 1916), Dr. Parker-Allen House (c. 1910), Baptist Church (1914-1915), United Methodist Church (1917), and Benson Elementary School (c. 1915).

It was listed on the National Register of Historic Places in 1985.

References

Historic districts on the National Register of Historic Places in North Carolina
Victorian architecture in North Carolina
Buildings and structures in Johnston County, North Carolina
National Register of Historic Places in Johnston County, North Carolina